Stéphane Jean François Pignol (born 3 January 1977) is a French retired professional footballer who played as a right back.

He appeared in 311 games in Segunda División over 11 seasons, scoring one goal. In La Liga, he represented Compostela, Numancia and Murcia.

Club career
Born in Aubagne, Bouches-du-Rhône, Pignol spent his entire professional career in Spain, representing SD Compostela (where he made his La Liga debut, consisting of three games in the 1997–98 season), Pontevedra CF, UD Almería, CD Numancia – was the Soria club's starter throughout the vast majority of the 2004–05 campaign, which again ended in top-flight relegation for the player – Real Murcia, Real Zaragoza and UD Las Palmas.

Pignol never appeared in less than 25 league matches during his spell in the Canary Islands, spent in Segunda División. At the end of 2012–13, after having helped Las Palmas to the sixth position, the 36-year-old retired from football.

Personal life
Born in France, Pignol is of Spanish descent. Pignol's older brother, Christophe (born 1969), was also a professional footballer and a defender. During his 14-year career he represented AS Saint-Étienne, FC Istres, FC Nantes, AS Monaco FC and Lille OSC, winning Ligue 1 titles with the third and fourth clubs.

References

External links

1977 births
Living people
People from Aubagne
Sportspeople from Bouches-du-Rhône
French footballers
French people of Spanish descent
Association football defenders
La Liga players
Segunda División players
Segunda División B players
SD Compostela footballers
Pontevedra CF footballers
UD Almería players
CD Numancia players
Real Murcia players
Real Zaragoza players
UD Las Palmas players
French expatriate footballers
Expatriate footballers in Spain
French expatriate sportspeople in Spain
Footballers from Provence-Alpes-Côte d'Azur